James Gerrard Lennon (1907–February 1976), known as Gerry Lennon, was a solicitor and Irish nationalist politician.

Lennon stood unsuccessfully for the National League of the North in South Armagh at the 1933 Northern Ireland general election.  In 1944, he was appointed to the Senate of Northern Ireland, serving as a Senator until the body was prorogued in 1972.   From 1948 until 1950, he served as a Deputy Speaker.

He was active in the Irish Anti-Partition League, and in 1951 became the Vice President of the Ancient Order of Hibernians (AOH), serving until 1975.  From 1962 to 63, he participated in the "Orange and Green" talks with George Clark, Grand Master of the Grand Orange Lodge of Ireland.

In 1965, Lennon became the Nationalist leader in the Senate, and in 1975 he became the President of the AOH.  He was also active in the Northern Irish Civil Rights Association, and in July 1969, took part in a sit-down protest in Armagh City Hall.

References

1907 births
1976 deaths
Members of the Senate of Northern Ireland 1941–1945
Members of the Senate of Northern Ireland 1945–1949
Members of the Senate of Northern Ireland 1949–1953
Members of the Senate of Northern Ireland 1953–1957
Members of the Senate of Northern Ireland 1957–1961
Members of the Senate of Northern Ireland 1961–1965
Members of the Senate of Northern Ireland 1965–1969
Nationalist Party (Ireland) members of the Senate of Northern Ireland
Solicitors from Northern Ireland
20th-century Irish lawyers